The House of Love and Prayer was a synagogue founded by Shlomo Carlebach in the 1960s. The synagogue's ritual was inspired by the American counterculture movement, and attracted young, non-affiliated Jews. The synagogue eventually disbanded, and some of the congregants relocated to Israel, founding Moshav Mevo Modi'im in 1975.

Founding of the synagogue
Shlomo Carlebach, a rabbi and singer-songwriter founded a synagogue inspired by the counterculture of the 1960s. Carlebach called his congregants "holy hippielech" ("holy hippies"). Many of Carlebach's followers soon began practicing Judaism according to the Orthodox tradition.

Legacy
Carlebach's synagogue inspired the creation of a musical presented by the National Yiddish Theatre titled "The House of Love and Prayer". Carlebach's daughter, Neshama Carlebach was among the production's collaborators.

See also
 Carlebach movement
Moshav (Band)

References

Synagogues in San Francisco
20th-century synagogues
Shlomo Carlebach